Anetarca brasiliana is a species of sea slug, specifically an aeolid nudibranch. It is a marine gastropod mollusc in the family Facelinidae.

Distribution
This species was described from the intertidal zone at Praia de Armação, Armação dos Búzios, on the Atlantic Ocean coast of Brazil.

References

Facelinidae
Gastropods described in 2004